Dweller is a 2010 horror novel by American writer Jeff Strand. The novel was nominated for the Bram Stoker Award for Best Novel in 2010. A limited edition hardcover version of the book was released by Dark Regions Press in July 2010, and a paperback version by Leisure Books in April 2010.

References

American horror novels
2010 American novels
Leisure Books books